Pia Mårtensson (born 3 January 1959) is a Swedish former freestyle swimmer. She competed in three events at the 1976 Summer Olympics.

References

External links
 

1959 births
Living people
Swedish female freestyle swimmers
Olympic swimmers of Sweden
Swimmers at the 1976 Summer Olympics
People from Varberg
Sportspeople from Halland County